The paint and sip industry includes experience-based businesses that hire professional artists to provide step-by-step instructions to reproduce a pre-selected work of art while they drink wine or other beverages. When class attendees finish, they get to keep their creations.

These classes typically focus on painting as a fun activity for “unwinding,” enrichment,” and “relieving stress”, rather than as a technical skill requiring practice like the classes at an atelier or an art school. Alcohol is used to reduce inhibitions and “overthinking” in order to make the creative process feel easier.

Business model
Paint and Sip studios are mostly franchises, and the industry has steadily increased in popularity since 2012.

The popularity of paint and sip companies among potential franchise owners is commonly attributed to the drive of professionals with marketing or business experience to "get out of Corporate America". Furthermore, the "party atmosphere" of paint and sip businesses, as well as the lack of a requirement to be "artistically savvy," are seen as draws for professionals with no background in the arts who want to make a career change.

The typical paint and sip business offers group painting classes that last for 2–3 hours. Customers are encouraged to bring their own beverages (BYOB), or purchase them if the studio has a liquor license.

The classes are heavily marketed to women as a "girls' night out" experience.

History

Sips 'N Strokes 
In 2002, Wendy Lovoy began hosting painting classes for kids and adults at her studio outside of Birmingham, Alabama. She noticed that the adults were taking too long to finish their paintings. Lovoy observed, “[The adults] were nervous about making them perfect. They couldn’t get out of their own heads.” Her business, Sips ’N Strokes, was the first to establish the BYOB painting class format.

Painting with a Twist 
In 2007, Cathy Deano and Renee Maloney founded Painting with a Twist in New Orleans, Louisiana. It became the first paint and sip company to franchise. Painting with a Twist acquired rival franchise Bottle & Bottega in 2018. In 2020, Painting with a Twist bought Color Me Mine (a paint-your-own pottery franchise) and Chesapeake Ceramics (a ceramics supplier), forming the parent company Twist Brands and making it a $100 million company. In 2015, it cost roughly $100,000 to open a Painting with a Twist franchise.

Pinot’s Palette 
In 2009, Beth Willis, Charles Willis, and Craig Ceccanti founded Pinot’s Palette in Houston, Texas. The company started franchising in 2010, offering franchisees three different formats for the business — a BYOB model, a bar model, and a retail studio model. In 2015, it cost $80,000–$170,000 to open a Pinot’s Palette franchise.

Wine and Design 
In 2010, Harriet Mills founded Wine and Design in Raleigh, North Carolina. The company started franchising in 2011. In 2015, it cost $35,000–$83,000 to open a Wine and Design franchise.

Paint Nite 
In 2012, Dan Hermann and Sean McGrail founded Paint Nite in Boston, Massachusetts. Unlike other paint and sip companies, Paint Nite operates out of already existing bars through a licensing business model rather than franchising model. In 2015, it cost $50,000–$70,000 to obtain the licensing rights to open a Paint Nite business.

Challenges in the industry 
Because the format of paint-and-sip classes depends on how new the experience is, it can be hard for businesses in this field to get customers to come back. To address this challenge, many businesses plan themed events, including holiday  , pet portrait painting sessions, nudist male model nights for bachelorette parties and singles nights, and erotic nights for couples.

As for many other public gathering spaces, paint and sip companies faced waning interest and significant financial challenges due to the COVID-19 pandemic. By November 2020, the number of Painting with a Twist franchises decreased from 350 to below 300 due to rolling economic shutdowns. Because of this, many of these businesses also hold online "paint and sip parties."

External links 

 Sips ‘N Strokes
 Painting With a Twist
 Pinot’s Palette
 Wine and Design
 Paint Nite

References

Franchises

Painting